John Sears Casey (December 31, 1930 – June 16, 2022) was an American attorney and politician who served as a member of the  Alabama House of Representatives from 1959 to 1967, representing Cleburne County, Alabama.

References

1930 births
2022 deaths
Members of the Alabama House of Representatives
Lawyers from Birmingham, Alabama
Politicians from Birmingham, Alabama
People from Heflin, Alabama
Auburn University alumni
Jacksonville State University alumni
University of Alabama School of Law alumni